is a one volume shōjo manga by .

The story revolves around a teenage girl called Mako who dreams of being called a Princess by her "Prince Charming". She idolizes her brother-in-law and wants a husband just like him to call her Princess, as he calls her sister. Things get complicated when her brother-in-law's brother, Ryu, moves in with Mako's family in order to finish his last year at high school.

External links

CPM Press
Shōjo manga
Romance anime and manga
1992 manga
Jitsugyo no Nihon Sha manga